Giuseppe Solenghi (Milan, 1879 - Cernobbio (Province of Como), 1944) was an Italian painter, depicting mainly landscapes and cityscapes (vedute).

Biography
From 1892 to 1895, he was a pupil at the Brera Academy, studying painting under Cesare Tallone, sculpture and engraving under Ernesto Bazzaro, and perspective under Giuseppe Mentessi. In 1895–1900, he dedicated himself to illuminated manuscripts. He began exhibiting his landscapes after the First World War. It is said that Leonardo Bazzaro influenced his choice of landscape and vedute. Rather than the sunlit pastoral views, he preferred to depict the humid panoramas of the canals of Milan and Venetian lagoons. He had a posthumous exhibition in the Galleria Boito of Milan, sponsored by the Fondazione Cariplo

References

1879 births
1944 deaths
19th-century Italian painters
Italian male painters
20th-century Italian painters
Painters from Milan
Italian landscape painters
Brera Academy alumni
19th-century Italian male artists
20th-century Italian male artists